Peter Carter (born 29 April 1959) is a former Australian rules footballer who played with South Melbourne and Collingwood in the Victorian Football League (VFL).

Carter, a Brentwood recruit, never had a regular run in the South Melbourne team, with his longest season lasting four games in 1979. He joined Collingwood in 1982, but played only once at his new club.

References

External links
 
 

1959 births
Australian rules footballers from Victoria (Australia)
Sydney Swans players
Collingwood Football Club players
Living people